Brassy were an English rock/hip hop band, formed in 1994 in Manchester by American singer Muffin Spencer, younger sister of Jon Spencer (of Jon Spencer Blues Explosion). The band split up in 2003 after releasing 2 studio albums.

History
Muffin Spencer moved to Manchester, UK in 1986. She became the lead singer with The Exuberants and later formed Brassy. Other members of the band were Stefan Gordon (guitar), Karen Frost (bass guitar, vocals), and Jonny Barrington (aka DJ Swett, drums). Influenced by The Smiths, their early material also drew comparisons with Elastica. Later they incorporated hip hop and punk rock influences and were compared to Beastie Boys, Plasmatics and Biz Markie.

Their earliest material was released on the Costermonger label (home to Gene). The band found favour with John Peel for whom they recorded a radio session in June 1996, with a return visit in May 2000. With financial difficulties affecting Costermonger they moved on to Wiiija where they released their debut album Got It Made in 2000.  Their 2000 track "Play Some D" was re-released in 2003 after it was used in the 'hellomoto' ad campaign by Motorola, leading to renewed interest in the band, and the recording of a second album, Gettin Wise. Gettin Wise received a mixed response from critics, and proved to be their final album, with the band members all finding themselves in debt after recording it.

Discography

Albums 

 Got It Made (11 July 2000), Wiija WIJ 1111
 Gettin Wise (12 May 2003), Wiija WIJ 1131
 Kim Possible soundtrack (22 July 2003), Walt DisneyWork it Out Singles 

 "Boss" b/w Route Out (Mar 1996), Costermonger COST 7 (#194 UK)
 "Straighten Out" b/w Right Back (Jul 1996), Costermonger COST 8 (#198 UK)
 "Sure Thing" b/w (remix) (1997), Costermonger COST 10
 Bonus Beats EP (24 May 1999) (Containing Good Times/Secrets/Back in Business/Bonus Beat), Wiija WIJ 98
 "Good Times" (1999) Wiija WIJ 88
 "I Can't Wait" (23 Aug 1999), Wiija  WIJ 103 (#136 UK)
 "Work It Out" (28 February 2000), Wiija WIJ 109 (#111 UK)
 "B'Cos We Rock" (Jul 2000), Wiija  WIJ 121
 Play Some D'' EP (16 Oct 2000), Wiija WIJ 123 (#179 UK)
 "Play Some D" (31 March 2003), Wiija WIJ 133 (#88 UK)

References

External links
 Official website (archived)

Alternative hip hop groups
English alternative rock groups